Trace Robert Coquillette (born June 4, 1974 in Carmichael, California) is a retired Major League Baseball third baseman and second baseman. He played during two seasons at the major league level for the Montreal Expos.

Career
Coquillette attended Casa Roble High School in Sacramento County, California where, in 1992, he was named first team all-city by the Sacramento Bee along with Derrek Lee and Geoff Jenkins. He played one season of college baseball at Sacramento City College in 1993 before being drafted by the Montreal Expos in the tenth round of the 1993 Major League Baseball Draft. On September 7, 1998, he was called up to the Major Leagues along with Ted Lilly, Carl Pavano and Fernando Seguignol. He made his debut that day against the Colorado Rockies at Olympic Stadium. He started at third base and was hitless in three at bats. Coquillette would appear in 17 games for the Expos that season and 34 games the following year. He would continue to appear in the minor leagues until 2005, playing in the farm systems of the Cleveland Indians, Detroit Tigers, Florida Marlins, Boston Red Sox and Chicago White Sox.

References

External links
, or Retrosheet

1974 births
Living people
Albany Polecats players
American expatriate baseball players in Canada
Baseball players from California
Buffalo Bisons (minor league) players
Burlington Bees players
Charlotte Knights players
Gulf Coast Expos players
Harrisburg Senators players
Major League Baseball second basemen
Major League Baseball third basemen
Montreal Expos players
Nashville Sounds players
Ottawa Lynx players
Pastora de los Llanos players
Pawtucket Red Sox players
People from Carmichael, California
Portland Sea Dogs players
Sacramento City Panthers baseball players
Sportspeople from Sacramento County, California
Tigres de Aragua players
American expatriate baseball players in Venezuela
Toledo Mud Hens players
Vermont Expos players
West Palm Beach Expos players